Bisbee High School is a high school in Bisbee, Arizona. It is part of the Bisbee Unified School District, which also operates an elementary school and a junior high school. The high school runs on a four-day school week.

Old Bisbee High School 
The old Bisbee High School is at 100 Old Douglas Rd, Bisbee, AZ

New Bisbee High School 
The current school was built in 1957/58 at 325 School Terrace Rd, Bisbee, AZ. The campus was designed by Edward L. Varney Associates of Phoenix. The construction contract to build the new campus was awarded to D. O. Norton & Son Construction Co. and Mullen Construction Co. both of Phoenix.

References

Public high schools in Arizona
Schools in Cochise County, Arizona
Bisbee, Arizona
1957 establishments in Arizona